Edward Bishop (4 August 1872 – 16 February 1943) was an Australian cricketer. He played for Western Australia between 1892 and 1899.

See also
 List of Western Australia first-class cricketers

References

External links

1872 births
1943 deaths
Australian cricketers
Place of birth missing
Western Australia cricketers